is a professional Japanese baseball player. He is a pitcher for the Tokyo Yakult Swallows of Nippon Professional Baseball (NPB).

References 

1996 births
Living people
Nippon Professional Baseball pitchers
Baseball people from Saga Prefecture
Tokyo Yakult Swallows players